Los Lagos Region (Region of the Lakes) is one of Chile's 16 regions, which are first order administrative divisions, and comprises four provinces: Chiloé, Llanquihue, Osorno and Palena. The region contains the country's second largest island, Chiloé, and the second largest lake, Llanquihue. Its capital is Puerto Montt; other important cities include Osorno, Castro, Ancud, and Puerto Varas. The mainland portion of Los Lagos Region south of Reloncaví Sound (Palena Province) is considered part of Patagonia.

Historically, the Huilliche have called this territory between Bueno River and Reloncaví Sound Futahuillimapu, meaning "great land of the south". The region hosts Monte Verde, one of the oldest archaeological sites of the Americas. The largest indigenous group of the region are the Huilliche who lived in the area before the arrival of the Spanish. The Spanish crown settled Chiloé Archipelago in 1567 while the rest of the region begun to be slowly colonized by non-indigenous people only in the late 18th century. In the 1850s Germans arrived to colonize the shores of Llanquihue Lake under a Chilean state-sponsored program.

Los Lagos Region economy is dominated by the service sector but based in fishing, salmon aquaculture, forestry and cattle farming. Tourism is economically important in The Andes where ski resorts, hot springs and recreational fishing are popular offers.

Geography 
The region is bordered on the north by Los Ríos Region, on the south by Aisén Region, on the west by the Pacific Ocean and on the east by Argentina (provinces of Neuquén, Río Negro and Chubut). Wild environments can be seen along the coastal area, such as Caleta Zorra.

Demography 

Principal Towns 

This section is translated from the corresponding Spanish page

The Región de Los Lagos has seventeen towns according to the 2017 census, of which eleven have more than 10000 inhabitants each.

Climate 

The region, in general, has a natural vegetation of Valdivian temperate rain forest. The coastal part, except for the south of the Chiloé Island, has a temperate climate with cold winter rain. To the south, the climate is characterized by constant rain and not having dry seasons.

Protected areas 

Protected areas include 7 national parks, 2 private-owned parks and 2 natural monuments.
National Parks

Alerce Andino
Chiloé
Corcovado
Hornopirén
Pumalín
Puyehue
Vicente Pérez Rosales

Private parks
Tantauco Park
Las Vertientes – Reserva Natural Privada
Natural monuments
Islotes de Puñihuil
Lahuen Ñadi

Economy

The region is the center of aquaculture in chile.

Transportation
El Tepual Airport lies a few miles west of Puerto Montt and Cañal Bajo Carlos Hott Siebert Airport a few miles east of Osorno. Also east of Osorno, the Cardenal Antonio Samoré Pass is a major mountain pass across the Andes to Argentina via Route 215.

See also

German colonization of Valdivia, Osorno and Llanquihue
Antillanca ski resort
Intermediate Depression

References

External links

http://www.frutillar.com 
http://www.regiondeloslagos.cl 
https://web.archive.org/web/20060625023200/http://www.regionx.cl/ 
Satellite view of Puerto Montt (Google maps)
Satellite view of the Chiloé archipielago (Google maps)
Satellite view of Lake Llanquihue (Google maps)
Satellite view of Osorno (Google maps)
Satellite view of Valdivia (Google maps)
Satellite view of Chaitén (Google maps)

 
Regions of Chile